Gurash (also Romanized as Gūrash; also known as Kūrash) is a village in Bastam Rural District, in the Central District of Chaypareh County, West Azerbaijan Province, Iran. At the 2006 census, its population was 220, in 42 families.

References 

Populated places in Chaypareh County